Cyperus ornatus is a species of sedge that is endemic to the Northern Territory of Australia.

The species was first formally described by the botanist Robert Brown in 1810.

See also
 List of Cyperus species

References

ornatus
Taxa named by Robert Brown (botanist, born 1773)
Plants described in 1810
Flora of the Northern Territory